Hassan Abdallah Hassan is a Somali politician. He is the former Mayor of Bosaso, the commercial capital of the autonomous Puntland region in northeastern Somalia. In 2011, the city's District Council unanimously voted to elect Hassan to office. He was previously the Deputy Finance Minister of Puntland.

Acting mayor 

On September 15, 2022 Hassan was nominated as the acting mayor of Bosaso, marking his second time at the mayoral office. Prior, he was serving as the Puntland Deputy Minister of Planning and International Cooperation.

Early life
He belongs Dishiishe clan of Darod groups.

References

External links
Duqa Degmada Bosaso ee hada la doortey Mudane Xasan Cabdalla Xasan oo balan qaadey isbadal cusub (Somali)

Ethnic Somali people
Living people
Mayors of places in Somalia
Year of birth missing (living people)